This is an article about a school of thought in the area of law. For economics, see historical school of economics.

The German Historical School of Jurisprudence is a 19th-century intellectual movement in the study of German law. With Romanticism as its background, it conceived of law as the organic expression of a national consciousness (Volksgeist). It stood in opposition to an earlier movement called Vernunftrecht (Rational Law).

Overview
The Historical School is based on the writings and teachings of Gustav von Hugo and especially Friedrich Carl von Savigny. Natural lawyers held that law could be discovered only by rational deduction from the nature of man.

The basic premise of the German Historical School is that law is not to be regarded as an arbitrary grouping of regulations laid down by some authority. Rather, those regulations are to be seen as the expression of the convictions of the people, in the same manner as language, customs and practices are expressions of the people. The law is grounded in a form of popular consciousness called the Volksgeist.

Laws can stem from regulations by the authorities, but more commonly they evolve in an organic manner over time without interference from the authorities. The ever-changing practical needs of the people play a very important role in this continual organic development.

In the development of a legal system, is it the professional duty of lawyers – in the sense of the division of labor in society – to base their academic work on law on ascertaining the will of the people. In this way, lawyers embody the popular will.

The German Historical School was divided into Romanists and the Germanists. The Romanists, to whom Savigny also belonged, held that the Volksgeist springs from the reception of the Roman law. While the Germanists (Karl Friedrich Eichhorn, Jakob Grimm, Georg Beseler, Otto von Gierke) saw medieval German Law as the expression of the German Volksgeist.

The German Historical School has had considerable influence on the academic study of law in Germany. Georg Friedrich Puchta and Bernhard Windscheid continued the Romanist vein founded by Savigny, leading to the so-called Pandektenwissenschaft which is seen as Begriffsjurisprudenz (conceptual jurisprudence).

Criticism 
Karl Marx devoted an 1842 essay "The philosophical manifesto of the historical school of law" to criticizing the historical school of law, calling it the "sole frivolous product" of the eighteenth century.

See also
Historism

References

Footnotes

Bibliography 
 Alessandro Hirata, Die Vollendung des usus modernus pandectarum: Christian Friedrich von Glück (1755–1831), Savigny Zeitschrift 123 (2006), 330-342.

Philosophy of law
Philosophical schools and traditions
Legal history of Germany